Christina Metaxa (Greek: Χριστίνα Μεταξά; born 4 April 1992) is a Greek-Cypriot singer and songwriter. Her elder brother, Nikolas Metaxas, is also a singer and won second place in the Greek version of The X Factor. Her brother is also the creator and composer of her Eurovision entry, "Firefly".

Metaxa was chosen by the public of Cyprus on 7 February 2009 with the song "Firefly" to represent the country at the Eurovision Song Contest 2009 in Moscow.  She competed in the second semifinal but missed out on the final. She was the spokesperson for Cyprus, giving the island's voting results during the Eurovision Song Contest 2010 final in Oslo.

Metaxa graduated from Brown University in Providence, Rhode Island.

Discography

Singles

See also
Cyprus in the Eurovision Song Contest 2009

References

External links

Christina Metaxa official homepage

Living people
21st-century Cypriot women singers
Eurovision Song Contest entrants for Cyprus
Eurovision Song Contest entrants of 2009
1992 births
Greek Cypriot singers
Brown University alumni